1969 Soviet Class B was a Soviet football competition at the Soviet third tier.

Russian Federation

Semifinal Group 1
 [Maykop]

Semifinal Group 2
 [Kislovodsk]

Semifinal Group 3
 [Kiselyovsk]

Semifinal Group 4
 [Novorossiysk]

Play-off for 1st place: 
 Cement Novorossiysk  2-1  Kord Balakovo  [aet]

Semifinal Group 5
 [Smolensk]

Semifinal Group 6
 [Rybinsk]

Final Group
 [Oct 28 – Nov 10, Maykop]

Play-off for 1st place: 
 Druzhba Maykop  1-0  Saturn Rybinsk

Ukraine

Final group
 [Oct 25 – Nov 2, Ivano-Frankovsk]

Caucasus

Kazakhstan

Central Asia

References
 All-Soviet Archive Site
 Results. RSSSF

Soviet Second League seasons
3
Soviet
Soviet